Apor was a Hungarian tribal chieftain, who, according to the Illuminated Chronicle, led a campaign against the Byzantine Empire in 959, where the legend of Botond takes place. He was the ancestor of the gens Apor.

The Apor family of Transylvanian nobility traditionally trace their origins to him. In his work Lusus Mundi, 17th-18th century historian Baron Péter Apor de Altorja claims such descent. Also, acknowledging that no surviving written sources explicitly state so, he proposed that Apor was a legitimate son of Hungary's Grand Prince Árpád.

References 

10th-century Hungarian people
Magyar tribal chieftains
Apor (genus)